The Apotamkin (also spelled apotampkin) is a creature in Native American mythology. According to the mythology, it is a giant fanged sea monster that lives in the Passamaquoddy Bay and pulls people in to eat them, particularly careless children. It is said to have long red hair, and in some versions, it was a human woman before being changed into a serpent. One interpretation of Apotamkin myth is that it was used to instill fear into children to keep them from venturing into areas alone and without parental guidance.

In popular culture, Apotampkin was briefly referenced in the 2008 film Twilight. It is often mistakenly called a "vampire" by non-Native Americans, especially since it was named as such in the film, but in Maliseet and Passamaquoddy legends it is unrelated to vampires.

References

Legendary creatures of the indigenous peoples of North America
Female legendary creatures
Legendary reptiles
Sea monsters